Sopvoma or Mao is a Sino-Tibetan language of Angami–Pochuri linguistic sub branch. It is spoken primarily in Senapati district, northwestern Manipur and in Nagaland, India. It is similar to Angami. According to Ethnologue (2009), the Paomata dialect may be the same as Poumei (Poumai) Naga, which has received a separate ISO code.

Phonology

Consonants 

 /t͡ʃʰ/ and /w/ only rarely occur, and with /t͡ʃʰ/ only occurring in word-initial position.
 [ɡ] only occurs marginally from loanwords.
 /t̪, p͡f/ in word-initial position may be heard as [t̪ʰ, p͡fʰ] in free variation, rarely as phonemic.
 /h/ may have an allophone of  word-initially, word medially in free variation. [x] rarely occurs as a phoneme.
 /m/ before a central vowel /ɨ/ can have an allophone of a labiodental .
 /n/ before high vowel sounds can have an allophone of a palatalized .

Vowels 

 [ə] only occurs inter-morphemically.
 /ɨ/ can be heard as rounded [ʉ] in free variation.
 In word-initial position, /i, u/ can be lowered to [ɪ, ʊ].
 /e, o/ can be lowered to [ɛ, ɔ] in word-final position.

References 



Angami–Pochuri languages
Languages of Manipur
Languages of Nagaland
Endangered Sino-Tibetan languages